is the fifth Jewelpet anime series created by Sanrio and Sega and animated by Studio Comet, announced in Shogakukan's Pucchigumi magazine and directed by Hiroaki Sakurai, released to coincide with the franchise' 5th anniversary. The series aired on April 6, 2013 and ended on March 29, 2014 on TV Tokyo and TV Osaka. Happiness is the final Jewelpet Anime animated by Studio Comet, ending the studio's 5-year run before Zexcs took over production for Lady Jewelpet. The series focuses on the main heroine Chiari Tsukikage and her friends on managing the Jewelpet Café.

The music in the series is composed by Wataru Maeguchi. Happiness is confirmed to have two official songs. For Episodes 1-39, the opening and ending theme is  while for Episodes 40 to 52, the opening and ending theme is titled RUN with U, both performed by the Japanese idol group Fairies. The song is composed by  Tetsuro Oda and arranged by Kaz.

TC Entertainment, a group company of Tokyo Broadcasting System Holdings, Mainichi Broadcasting System and Chubu-Nippon Broadcasting announced 4 official DVD-Box sets of the series, each of the box sets containing 4 discs, spanning into each half of the series. The first box set is released on October 25, 2013 and will span into 4 discs. It includes a creditless version of the OP and ED videos, several concept art used in the anime, official cast and staff commentary and a limited 5th anniversary postcard of Ruby along with the heroines of all 5 series. The second box set is released on January 31, 2014, the third box set is released on April 25, 2014 and the fourth is released on June 27, 2014.

Episode list

References

General
 http://www.tv-tokyo.co.jp/anime/jp-happiness/

Specific

Happiness